Heartland is the third full-length album by Canadian indie rock artist Owen Pallett, released January 12, 2010 on Domino Records. It's the first of Pallett's records to be released under their own name. Since the album was their first to be released in Japan, they wished to avoid generating confusion with the Final Fantasy video games from Square Enix, and to avoid infringing on any trademarks. Pallett stated that their previous albums will be repackaged and reissued under their own name at some point.

The record was mixed by New York producer Rusty Santos.

The album was a shortlisted nominee for the 2010 Polaris Music Prize.

Concept and development
As a prelude to the album, Pallett recorded an EP, Spectrum, 14th Century. Both the EP and the subsequent full-length are set in an imaginary realm called Spectrum. The songs on Heartland form a narrative concerning a "young, ultra-violent farmer" named Lewis, commanded by an all-powerful narrator—named Owen. According to Pallett, the songs are one-sided dialogues with Lewis speaking to his creator.

In an interview, Pallett commented that the idea behind Heartland is "preposterous. I wanted to have this contained narrative that has the breadth of a Paul Auster short story." Michael Barclay of Maclean's states that the lyrics raise all sorts of theological questions about believers' relationship with a deity and the nature of fate, but the construct is just a blank canvas. Pallett said, "Really, it's just all about me. All records are about their singer. I was trying to play with that."

Pallett has noted that the album was "most inspired" by British electronic band Orchestral Manoeuvres in the Dark.

Critical reception

The album received positive reviews. 
At 2010 year end, Heartland received Exclaim!'s No. 5 spot for best Pop & Rock Albums.  Exclaim! writer Andrea Warner said Heartland's themes of anger, isolation and loneliness resonate, and the sonic nods to '70s disco and pop prove ridiculously catchy, bordering on radio-friendly."

Track listing
"Midnight Directives" - 3:36
"Keep the Dog Quiet" - 3:10
"Mount Alpentine" - 0:49
"Red Sun No. 5" - 3:41
"Lewis Takes Action" - 2:54
"The Great Elsewhere" - 5:50
"Oh Heartland, Up Yours!" - 4:07
"Lewis Takes Off His Shirt" - 5:08
"Flare Gun" - 2:21
"E Is for Estranged" - 5:25
"Tryst with Mephistopheles" - 6:53
"What Do You Think Will Happen Now?" - 2:38

Japanese edition bonus tracks
<li> "Midnight Directives" (Max Tundra remix) - 2:51
<li> "Keep the Dog Quiet" (Simon Bookish remix) - 5:26

Singles
The first single off the album was "Lewis Takes Action". It was released in January 2010 in a limited edition on 7" vinyl and includes one exclusive b-side called "A Watery Day". The second single, "Lewis Takes Off His Shirt", was released digitally on March 29, 2010. The music video for the song was directed by M. Blash, and it features the film and stage actress Alison Pill. "Lewis Takes Off His Shirt" was released on 12" vinyl on June 22, 2010. The single includes remixes by Dan Deacon, Benoît Pioulard, CFCF, Simon Bookish and Max Tundra.

Personnel

Written, arranged and produced by Owen Pallett
Recorded by Sturla Mio Þórisson (except tracks 3 and 12)
Mixed by Rusty Santos
Mastered by Alan Douches
Design and illustration by Colin Bergh
Photography by Jimmy Limit
Make-up by Allison Magpayo
The Czech Symphony Strings
Directed by Adam Klemens
Recorded by Jan Holzner

The St. Kitts' Winds
Contracted by John Marshman
Recorded by Jeff McMurrich, Matt Smith
Lisa Chisholm - bassoon
Micah Hellbrum - clarinet
Sarah Jeffrey - oboe, cor anglais
Leonie Wall - flute, piccolo
Gabe Radford - horn
David Pell - trombone
Mike Fedyshyn - trumpet

References

2010 albums
Concept albums
Owen Pallett albums
Domino Recording Company albums